Liberec District is the district (okres) within the Liberec Region of Czech Republic. As its name implies, its administrative center is the city of Liberec.

Complete list of municipalities
Bílá - 
Bílý Kostel nad Nisou - 
Bílý Potok - 
Bulovka - 
Černousy - 
Český Dub - 
Cetenov - 
Chotyně - 
Chrastava - 
Čtveřín -
Dětřichov - 
Dlouhý Most - 
Dolní Řasnice - 
Frýdlant - 
Habartice - 
Hejnice - 
Heřmanice - 
Hlavice - 
Hodkovice nad Mohelkou - 
Horní Řasnice - 
Hrádek nad Nisou - 
Jablonné v Podještědí -
Janovice v Podještědí -
Janův Důl - 
Jeřmanice - 
Jindřichovice pod Smrkem - 
Kobyly - 
Krásný Les - 
Křižany - 
Kryštofovo Údolí - 
Kunratice - 
Lázně Libverda - 
Lažany - 
Liberec - 
Mníšek - 
Nová Ves - 
Nové Město pod Smrkem - 
Oldřichov v Hájích - 
Osečná - 
Paceřice - 
Pěnčín - 
Pertoltice - 
Příšovice - 
Proseč pod Ještědem - 
Radimovice - 
Raspenava - 
Rynoltice - 
Šimonovice - 
Soběslavice - 
Stráž nad Nisou - 
Světlá pod Ještědem - 
Svijanský Újezd - 
Svijany - 
Sychrov - 
Višňová - 
Vlastibořice - 
Všelibice - 
Žďárek - 
Zdislava

References

 
Districts of the Czech Republic